Sadar (also Romanized as Sādar) is a village in Bondar Rural District, Senderk District, Minab County, Hormozgan Province, Iran. At the 2006 census, its population was 163, in 37 families. Orqqpq

References 

Populated places in Minab County